Rublevka or Rublyovka is the unofficial name of a prestigious residential area in the western suburbs of Moscow, Russia, located along Rublyovo-Uspenskoye Highway, Podushkinskoe, 1st Uspenskoe and 2nd Uspenskoe highways. The name derives from the name of the highway: Rublyovskoye shosse. There is no official administrative unit called "Rublyovka", but this name has become popular in society and in mass media. The area features good ecology and rather clear air in comparison to Moscow and the rest of its suburbs.

Many Russian government officials and successful businesspeople reside in the gated communities of Rublevka. Real-estate prices there are among the highest in the world. The New York Times called it "home to the sprawling villas of Russia's ruling class".

History
Rublyovskoe Highway has been a place for the privileged ever since it was the Tsars road in the 16th century: for the entire Romanov dynasty. Russian rulers Mikhail Fyodorovich, Aleksey Mikhaylovich, Peter the Great and Catherine the Great made pilgrimages to the Savvino-Storozhevsky Monastery by this road. Also this picturesque area was always the favorite place for the royal falcon hunting. Here, near the sovereigns, the Russian nobility also made their homes, particularly the Princes Yusupov, Shuvalov and Golitsyn. At the time of the Russian Revolution in 1917, the Zubalov family owned the estate Rubllevka.

The area was where the dachas of Lenin and Stalin were located, as well as the summer residences of all the subsequent general secretaries, from Nikita Khrushchev to Mikhail Gorbachev. Their sidekicks also settled here (Anastas Mikoyan, Felix Dzerzhinsky, Nikolai Yezhov) – side-by-side with famous scientists, artists and writers (Mstislav Rostropovich, Andrei Sakharov, Dmitry Shostakovich), and foreign diplomats. And they all lived on a small stretch of highway that is only 35 kilometers long. During the Soviet period, General Secretary Leonid Brezhnev may have gone for a walk and encountered Aleksandr Solzhenitsyn, who was being hunted by the KGB and hiding out at Mstislav Rostropovich's dacha. .

In the mid-1990s, Rublyovka, which borders on the pristine and well-forested bank of the Moscow River was swiftly privatized by stars of show-business, the demi monde, officials and industrial magnates, and turned into a kind of a ‘millionaires’ ghetto’, or a Russian Beverly Hills, "where it is outrageous not to be good-looking". Here you can find the most expensive market in the world, and the most expensive sports club, as well as the most exclusive boutiques and the highest fences, with an army of thousands of security guards".

Geography and amenities
The district is 40 minutes to Moscow via a two-lane paved road; however, the road is sometimes closed due to travels by Vladimir Putin and other important Russian officials. There is a high-end shopping mall, Barvikha Luxury Village, where such brands as Prada, Gucci, and Dolce & Gabbana are offered. The mall includes Bentley and Ferrari/Maserati dealerships. There is also a wedding palace and a concert hall. Gated communities include Tagankovo.

Notable residents 
The area is known for its residents' high net worth. It was revealed in January 2020 that Mikhail Mishustin and his wife own a property in Rublyovka. Mishustin was named by President Vladimir Putin in January as the nominee to become the next Russian Prime Minister. His Rublyovka home and downtown apartment have a combined value of $15m (£10.9m).
Mikhail Mishustin

Notes

References

Books

See also
Barvikha
Homes of the Russian "elite" in Rubliovkam Blog Tolkovatelia (in Russian) 
Insider unmasks rich Russians, BBC (in English)

Geography of Moscow Oblast
Gated communities